Darryl Sims (born July 23, 1961 in Winston-Salem, North Carolina) is a former professional American football defensive tackle who played four seasons in the National Football League for the Pittsburgh Steelers (1985–1986) and the Cleveland Browns (1987–1988). Darryl now works for the University of Wisconsin-Oshkosh as the Athletics Director.   Sims continued his education for a bachelor's degree in Speech Communication in 2003, and a master's degree in Educational Leadership in 2005.

Darryl Sims graduated from Bassick High School in Bridgeport, CT.

References

1961 births
Living people
Players of American football from Winston-Salem, North Carolina
American football defensive tackles
Wisconsin Badgers football players
Pittsburgh Steelers players
Cleveland Browns players
Amsterdam Admirals coaches
Berlin Thunder coaches